Claudio "Clau" Mendes Vicente (born 8 December 2000) is a professional footballer who plays as a left winger for Spanish club UD Logroñés, on loan from UD Las Palmas. Born in Spain, he represents Guinea-Bissau internationally.

Club career
Born in Arrecife, Lanzarote, Canary Islands to Bissau-Guinean parents, Mendes represented SRCyD Torrelavega and CD Orientación Marítima as a youth before joining UD Las Palmas in 2019. Initially assigned to the C-team in Tercera División, he made his senior debut on 31 August of that year, coming on as a half-time substitute in a 1–2 away loss against CD Buzanada.

Mendes scored his first senior goal on 7 September 2019, netting the last in a 3–0 home success over EMF Atlético Unión Güímar. In December, he also started to feature for the reserves in Segunda División B.

Mendes made his first team debut with the Amarillos on 13 June 2020, replacing Juanjo Narváez late into a 0–0 Segunda División home draw against Girona FC; aged 19 years and 188 days, he became the third-youngest debutant of the club's history who was born in the isle of Lanzarote, only behind Sito and Antonio Betancort's debuts.

Mendes scored his first professional goal on 20 September 2020, netting a last-minute equalizer in a 3–3 home draw against CF Fuenlabrada. On 25 January 2022, after being rarely used, he was loaned to Primera División RFEF side CF Rayo Majadahonda for the remainder of the campaign.

On 3 August 2022, Mendes moved to fellow third division side UD Logroñés on loan for one year.

International career
Born in Spain, Mendes is of Bissau-Guinean descent. He represented the latter's under-18s for the 2019 Africa U-17 Cup of Nations qualification, scoring a goal on his debut.

Personal life
Mendes' twin brother Leo is also a footballer. A goalkeeper, both finished their formation at Orientación before moving to different teams.

References

External links
 
 
 

2000 births
Living people
People from Arrecife
Sportspeople from the Province of Las Palmas
Spanish sportspeople of African descent
Spanish people of Bissau-Guinean descent
Bissau-Guinean footballers
Spanish footballers
Footballers from the Canary Islands
Association football wingers
Segunda División players
Primera Federación players
Segunda División B players
Tercera División players
UD Las Palmas C players
UD Las Palmas Atlético players
UD Las Palmas players
CF Rayo Majadahonda players
UD Logroñés players
Guinea-Bissau youth international footballers
Twin sportspeople
Spanish twins